Arnaud Brisebois is a Canadian visual effects and production designer. He is most noted for his work on the film The Time Thief (L'Arracheuse de temps), for which he, Jean Babin and Ève Turcotte won the Canadian Screen Award for Best Art Direction/Production Design at the 10th Canadian Screen Awards in 2022.

He and Francis Leclerc, the director of The Time Thief, previously co-directed the short film Trotteur, which was the winner of the Jutra Award for Best Live Action Short Film at the 14th Jutra Awards in 2012.

References

External links

Canadian production designers
Special effects people
Best Art Direction/Production Design Genie and Canadian Screen Award winners
French Quebecers
Film directors from Quebec
Living people
Year of birth missing (living people)